Sir Everard Joseph Reginald Henry Radcliffe, 5th Baronet (27 January 1884 – 23 November 1969), the 5th of the Radcliffe baronets, was an English amateur first-class cricketer.

He was born at Hensleigh House, Tiverton, Devon, England, and was educated at Downside School and Oxford University.

He played in 64 first-class matches for Yorkshire County Cricket Club between 1909 and 1911. He succeeded Lord Hawke as captain for one season in 1910. In first-class cricket Radcliffe scored 826 runs at 10.86, and took two wickets at an average of 67.00 and 21 catches. He also played for the Yorkshire Gentlemen, Oxford University Authentics, and appeared in a single match in 1903 for Shropshire.

He worked was a stockbroker in Newcastle-upon-Tyne. The Radcliffe family lived at Rudding Park House in Harrogate, Yorkshire, from 1824 until the estate was sold in 1972.

He was a Knight of Grace and Devotion of the Sovereign Military Order of Malta.

He died in November 1969 at St Trinian's Hall, Richmond, Yorkshire, aged 85.

References

External links
Everard Radcliffe at Cricinfo
Everard Radcliffe at Cricket Archive

1884 births
1969 deaths
English cricketers
English stockbrokers
Yorkshire cricketers
Yorkshire cricket captains
Businesspeople from Tiverton, Devon
Baronets in the Baronetage of the United Kingdom
20th-century English businesspeople
Sportspeople from Tiverton, Devon